Clifford Edward Berry (April 19, 1918 – October 30, 1963) helped John Vincent Atanasoff create the first digital electronic computer in 1939, the Atanasoff–Berry computer (ABC).

Biography
Clifford Berry was born April 19, 1918, in Gladbrook, Iowa, to Fred and Grace Berry. His father owned an appliance repair shop, where he was able to learn about radios. He graduated from Marengo High School in Marengo, Iowa, in 1934 as the class valedictorian at age 16. He went on to study at Iowa State College (now known as Iowa State University), eventually earning a bachelor's degree in electrical engineering in 1939 and followed by his master's degree in physics in 1941.

In 1942, he married an ISU classmate and Atanasoff's secretary, Martha Jean Reed.

By 1948, he earned his PhD in physics from Iowa State University.

He died in 1963, attributed to "possible suicide".

References

External links
1942 and 1962 photos of Berry, Ames Laboratory Archive, Iowa State
Atanasoff-Berry Computer Archive, Computer Science Dept., Iowa State
June 7, 1972 interview with Atanasoff on Berry, Smithsonian National Museum of American History
A. R. Mackintosh, “Dr. Atanasoff’s Computer”, Scientific American, August 1988 (Archived 2009-10-31)
"ABC - Atanasoff-Berry Computer", I Programmer
IEEE Computer Pioneers Biography Entry

American computer scientists
20th-century American physicists
Iowa State University alumni
1918 births
1963 deaths